Magnat-l’Etrange is a commune in the Creuse department in the Nouvelle-Aquitaine region in central France.

Geography
The commune is within the natural park of the Millevaches (1000 lakes, not cows).

Population

Sights
 The church, dating from the eleventh century.
 The fifteenth-century château.
 The Château Dubost, dating from the sixteenth century.

See also
Communes of the Creuse department

References

Communes of Creuse